John Graham-Gilbert (1794 – 4 June 1866) was a Scottish portrait painter and art collector.

Life

Graham-Gilbert was born in Glasgow as John Graham, the son of David Graham a West India merchant and co-owner of Graham, Milne & Co who owned a counting house (accountants) on Queen Strett. John was at first trained in his father's counting-house, but preferred art and travelled to London in 1818 where he was admitted into the Royal Academy. In 1819 he won a silver medal for best drawing from the antique, and in 1821 a gold medal for his historical painting of ‘The Prodigal Son.’ He established himself in London as a portrait-painter, and contributed to the exhibitions of the Royal Academy from 1820 to 1823. He then went to Italy to study old masters of the Venetian school.

He settled in Edinburgh in 1827, living at 14 George Street in the New town. He sent a portrait to the first exhibition of the Royal Scottish Academy. In 1834 he married the wealthy heiress Miss Jane Gilbert of Yorkhill. He added her name to his, and moved to her native Glasgow. He remained an exhibitor at the Royal Scottish Academy, but from 1844 he also exhibited at the Royal Academy in London

He died at Yorkhill House in north-west Glasgow on 4 June 1866. He is buried on the northern slope of the Glasgow Necropolis.

Yorkhill House was demolished around 1910 to make way for the Hospital for Sick children.

Family

In 1834, on marriage to Jane Gilbert, daughter of Andrew Gilbert a rich Glasgow merchant, he thereafter called himself John Graham Gilbert. Through this marriage he inherited Yorkhill House from his father-in-law.

Trivia

The counting house where Graham Gilbert trained still exists on the corner of Queen Street and St Vincent Street. Now a bar, it is called The Counting House and is relatively intact both inside and out.

Works

Art collection

His widow Mrs. Graham-Gilbert, who died in 1877, bequeathed to the Corporation Galleries of Art at Glasgow a small collection left to her by her husband, together with a number of his own pictures, totalling 70 paintings. These include works by Palma Vecchio, Gaspard Dughet, Paris Bordone and Dutch masters such as Rembrandt, Johannes Lingelbach, Nicolaes Eliasz. Pickenoy, Philips Wouwerman, Willem van de Velde the Younger and Ludolf Bakhuizen that are considered highlights of the Kelvingrove Art Gallery and Museum.

References 

:s:Graham-Gilbert, John (DNB00)
 John Graham Gilbert in the Oxford Biography Index, Number 101011228

1794 births
1866 deaths
Artists from Glasgow
19th-century Scottish painters
Scottish male painters
Scottish portrait painters
Scottish art collectors
Alumni of the Royal Academy Schools
Royal Scottish Academicians
Burials at the Glasgow Necropolis
19th-century Scottish male artists